Ziaur Rahman, the 7th president of Bangladesh, was assassinated by a faction of officers of Bangladesh Army, on 30 May 1981, in the south-eastern port city of Chittagong. Rahman went to Chittagong to arbitrate in a clash between the local leaders of his political party, the Bangladesh Nationalist Party. On the night of 30 May, a group of officers commandeered the Chittagong Circuit House, a government residence where Rahman was staying, shooting him and several others.

Events
At 4 AM on 30 May 1981, three teams of army officers attacked the Chittagong Circuit House where Rahman was asleep. In all there were 16 army officers as soldiers refused to join. They had eleven submachine guns, three Rocket Launchers and three grenade firing rifles. All members of the attacking team were commissioned officers.

Main leaders of this attacking team were Lt. Colonel Matiur Rahman, Lt. Colonel Mahbub and Major Khaled Lieutenant Colonel Fazle Hossain started the attack by launching two rockets towards the circuit house which created two large holes in the building. The officers then searched room to room for Rahman. Major Mojaffar and Captain Moslehdudin found the president first. Moslehuddin informed Rahman that they would take him to the cantonment. Shortly afterwards, however, Colonel Matiur Rahman arrived with another team and shot him from close range with a submachine gun.

Among the attackers, Lt. Col. Matiur Rahman and Col. Mahbub were killed while trying to escape, Major Khaled and Major Mojaffar escaped, and Captain Moslehuddin was caught and sentenced to life in prison. However, as of 2010, he is in the United States.

Aftermath

After the assassination of Rahman on 30 May 1981, Hussain Muhammad Ershad, the Chief of Army Staff, remained loyal to the government and ordered the army to suppress the coup attempt of Rahman's associates led by Major General Abul Manzoor.

Government ordered the rebel force to surrender and gave them a time limit. Most soldiers including officers who took part in the mission to attack in Chittagong Circuit House did surrender and so the leading officer including GOC Manjoor were trying to escape towards Chittagong Hill Tracts. On the way they were intervened by government-sent force. Colonel Matiur Rahman and Lt Colonel Mahub (chief of 21st East Bengal, nephew of Manjoor) were shot to death by Major Mannan (a Pakistan return officer, 2IC of 12 Engineer Battalion).

General Manjoor was caught at Fatikchhari by both Police and Army force while Manjoor and his wife were feeding their children inside a tea garden. However, he surrendered to Police and he was taken to Hathazari thana. General Manjoor requested a lawyer, which he was refused. He then asked to be sent to Chittagong jail, otherwise he said, the army would kill him. But when he got on the police van, an army squad arrived at the prison and after some debate a certain Nayeb Subadar caught General Manjoor's hand and forced him towards the army vehicle. He was then blinded and hands were tightened. However, what happened afterwards was never released by the Government and was classified. The government later announced that General Manjoor has been killed by unruly soldiers who were enraged after knowing that General Manjoor was the key conspirator of the assassination.

Manzoor's death – at first described as having been at the hands of an "enraged mob", but later shown in an autopsy report to have been via a gunshot to the back of the head – added to the mystery. The rest of the conspirators were tried in military court, and given sentences ranging from the death penalty to imprisonment.

Following Rahman's death, Vice President of Bangladesh Justice Abdus Sattar became Acting President. He was elected in a popular vote in December 1981 but was deposed on 24 March 1982 by a bloodless coup by Ershad.

One of the accused of Rahman's murder case, captain (Rtd.) Giasuddin Ahmed is now an Awami League member of Jatiya Sangshad from Gaffargaon Upazila, Mymensingh District.

Twelve officers, mostly veterans, were hanged for their alleged involvement in the killing of President Rahman after a hasty trial in a military court that was completed in only 18 days.  The 13th officer was hanged two years later as he was being treated for bullet wounds he had received during the assassination.

Trial
18 officers were brought before a military tribunal, 13 were sentenced to death whilst 5 were given varying prison sentences. The officers were arrested between 1 and 3 June 1981 and a court martial, chaired by Major General Abdur Rahman began at Chittagong Central Jail on 10 July 1981 and ended on 28 July 1981. Twelve officers were executed. Major General Abdur Rahman, a Pakistan returned officer, was later sent to France in 1983/84 as ambassador, dying there mysteriously; his family claimed General Rahman was killed by the government of Bangladesh.

Executed officers
 Brigadier Mohsin Uddin Ahmed
 Colonel Nawajesh Uddin
 Colonel M Abdur Rashid
 Lt Colonel AYM Mahfuzur Rahman
 Lt Colonel M Delwar Hossain
 Lt Colonel Shah Md Fazle Hossain
 Major AZ Giashuddin Ahmed
 Major Rawshan Yazdani Bhuiyan
 Major Kazi Mominul Haque
 Major Mujibur Rahman
 Captain Mohammad Abdus Sattar
 Captain Jamil Haque
 Lieutenant Mohammad Rafiqul Hassan Khan

(Rafiq later claimed he was on a mission under orders from his superior officer, without knowledge of the mission.)
The army prosecutors, who were appointed to defend these 13 suspected officers later called the trial a 'farcical trial' as they all were denied the minimal opportunity to defend.

Sentenced to Prison
 Lt Mosleh Uddin. (life sentence, as 2010 was living in the USA)
(Mosleh Uddin was the younger brother of Brigadier Mohsin Uddin Ahmed, who was sentenced to be executed. As elder brother was sentenced to die, younger brother was not given death sentence.)

Expelled officers
Following officers were removed from Army.

 Brigadier Abu Said Matiul Hannan Shah
 Brigadier AKM Azizul Islam
 Brigadier Gias Uddin Ahmed Chowdhury (Bir Bikram)
 Brigadier Abu Jafar Aminul Huque (Bir Bikram)
 Colonel Md. Bajlul Goni Patwari (Bir Protik)
 Lt. Colonel AS Enamul Huque
 Lt. Colonel Md. Jainul Abedin
 Lt. Colonel Md. Abdul Hannan (Bir Protik)
 Major Manjur Ahmed (Bir Protik)
 Major Wakar Hassan (Bir Protik)
 Major Md. Abdul Jalil
 Major Rafiqul Islam
 Major Md. Abdus Salam
 Major AKM Rezaul Islam (Bir Protik)
 Major Md. Asaduzzaman
 Captain Jahirul Huque Khan (Bir Protik)
 Captain Majharul Huque
 Captain ASM Abdul Hai
 Captain Ilyas (was in Rajshahi jail with Brig. Mohsin)
 Lt. Abul Hashem

See also
 1982 Bangladesh coup d'état 
 Assassination of Sheikh Mujibur Rahman
 Bangladesh: A Legacy of Blood
 Deyal

References

External links
Mascarenhas, Anthony. Bangladesh: A Legacy of Blood. London: Hodder and Stoughton, 1986.

Military history of Bangladesh
Assassinations in Bangladesh
1981 murders in Bangladesh
Military coups in Bangladesh
Ziaur Rahman
May 1981 events in Asia
1980s coups d'état and coup attempts
Crime in Chittagong
1981 in Bangladesh